Mary Joe Fernández and Arantxa Sánchez Vicario were the defending champions but did not compete that year.

Florencia Labat and Dominique Van Roost won in the final 6–3, 6–1 against Rachel McQuillan and Nicole Pratt.

Seeds
Champion seeds are indicated in bold text while text in italics indicates the round in which those seeds were eliminated.

 Debbie Graham /  Kimberly Po (quarterfinals)
 Florencia Labat /  Dominique Van Roost (champions)
 Rachel McQuillan /  Nicole Pratt (final)
 Meike Babel /  Laura Golarsa (quarterfinals)

Draw

External links
 1998 Páginas Amarillas Open Doubles Draw

Doubles